Gartempe (Limousin: Gartempa) is a commune in the Creuse department in the Nouvelle-Aquitaine region in central France.

Geography
The river Gartempe forms part of the commune's southern boundary.

Population

Sights
 The church, dating from the sixteenth century.
 The chateau, dating from the seventeenth century.

See also
Communes of the Creuse department

References

Communes of Creuse